McGaw Peak is a prominent peak, over  high, on the ridge between Land Glacier and Paschal Glacier in Marie Byrd Land, Antarctica. It stands midway between Mount McCoy and Pearson Peak. The peak was mapped by the United States Geological Survey from surveys and U.S. Navy aerial photographs, 1959–65, and was named by the Advisory Committee on Antarctic Names for Major Hugh R.L. McGaw, U.S. Army, a Logistics Research Officer on the staff of the Commander, U.S. Naval Support Force, Antarctica, during Operation Deep Freeze 1971 and 1972.

References

Mountains of Marie Byrd Land